Li Tong (李彤, born 6 May 1967) is a Chinese former hurdler who competed in the 1992 Summer Olympics and in the 1996 Summer Olympics.

Running for Washington State, he was the 1990-1 NCAA Indoor Champion for 55 meter hurdles.

Competition record

References

1967 births
Living people
Chinese male hurdlers
Olympic male hurdlers
Olympic athletes of China
Athletes (track and field) at the 1992 Summer Olympics
Athletes (track and field) at the 1996 Summer Olympics
Asian Games gold medalists for China
Asian Games medalists in athletics (track and field)
Athletes (track and field) at the 1994 Asian Games
Medalists at the 1994 Asian Games
Runners from Beijing
Competitors at the 1990 Goodwill Games
World Athletics Championships athletes for Japan
Japan Championships in Athletics winners